Amyema thalassia is a species of mistletoe in the family Loranthaceae native to Western Australia and the Northern Territory.

It was first described in 1962 by Bryan Alwyn Barlow.

Description 
The leaves are rounded and fleshy, with an obtuse base, a blunt apex and a winged petiole. The corolla is four-winged, and red at the base and green at the apex. There are four stamens.

References

External links
Amyema thalassia occurrence data from the Australasian Virtual Herbarium

thalassia

Flora of Western Australia
Parasitic plants
Flora of the Northern Territory
Epiphytes
Taxa named by Bryan Alwyn Barlow
Plants described in 1962